The first season of the Romanian reality television series Top Chef began airing on November 5, 2012 on Antena 1. The host was Alina Pușcaș and the judges were Joseph Hadad, Tudor Constantinescu and Nicolai Tand. Twenty-four contestants appeared.

Judges
Alina Pușcaș (host)
Joseph Hadad (judge)
Nicolai Tand (judge)
Tudor Constantinescu (judge)

Contestants
Twenty-four chefs competed in the first season of Top Chef. In order of elimination:

Contestant Progress

 (WINNER) The chef won the season and was crowned Top Chef.
 (RUNNER-UP) The chef was a runner-up for the season.
 (WIN) The chef won that episode's Elimination Challenge.
 (PC) The chef won the Quickfire and received Passcard and did not have to compete in the next Challenge.
 (HIGH) The chef was selected as one of the top entries in the Elimination Challenge, but did not win.
 (LOW) The chef was selected as one of the bottom entries in the Elimination Challenge, but was not eliminated.
 (OUT) The chef lost that week's Elimination Challenge and was out of the competition.
 (IN) The chef neither won nor lost that week's Elimination Challenge. They also were not up to be eliminated.
 IN (+) The chef won a pair or team challenge but was not chosen as one of the judges' favorites.
 IN (-) The chef lost a pair or team challenge but was not selected as one of the judges' least favorites.

Episodes
Most episodes includes two challenges. The Quickfire Challenge is a short, simple challenge with a varying reward each week; in the initial episodes of the season, it usually guarantees the winner immunity from being sent home that week; however, in some episodes the Quickfire winner is instead given an advantage in the upcoming Elimination Challenge. Sometimes, the winner of the Quickfire is given an additional prize, including money. The Elimination Challenge is a more complex challenge that determines who goes home. One or more judges join the show each week to evaluate both the Quickfire and Elimination challenges. Each week's elimination is announced in a segment called "Judges' Table."

Episode 1

November 5, 2012

Knife Challenge: The contestants must chop a cow. They are divided into six groups. The winning group is Cerasela's group.
Quickfire Challenge: Chefs must cook a dish using beef.  The winner receives Pass Card and immunity.
Top: Dragoș B., Giovanni, Ionuț L.
Bottom: Dan, Ovidiu, Robert C.
Sentenced to duel: Dan
WINNER: Dragoș B. (Beef with chocolate)
Team Challenge: The chefs are divided into two teams. Giovanni and Ionuț L. are team capintans. Because Dan is sentenced to duel he did not participate in this team challenge.
White Team: Giovanni, Robert G., Nicolae, Aura, Nico, Mihai N., Dragoș I. Ionuț Ș., Relu.
Black Team: Ioniț L., Mihai Z., Cerasela, Maria, Dana, Ovidiu, Adrian, Alexandru, Ionuț N., Iosif, Mihăiță
WINNERS: Black Team
Survival Challenge: Because Team White lost Team Challenge they into the Survival Challenge
Eliminated: Robert C.
Sentenced to duel: Marius
Duel: Marius received (Schaorma) and Dan received (Hamburger)
Survivor: Dan
Eliminated: Marius

2012 Romanian television seasons